Shake It Like This is the first album from Australian children's band Lah-Lah. It was released independently coinciding with Lah-Lah's debut live season at the Seymour Centre in Sydney in January 2009.

Track listing

"Lah-Lah's Big Live Band" (M & T Harris)
"Shake It Like This" (M & T Harris)
"The Band On The Bus" (Trad. arr. M & T Harris)
"Five More Minutes" (M & T Harris)
"Mister Saxophone" (M & T Harris)
"Brush Your Teeth" (M & T Harris)
"Rainbow Colours" (M, T & L Harris)
"Aah Choo Gesundheit" (M & T Harris)
"Meeney Miney Moe" (M, T & L Harris)
"I Don't Want a Dog" (A Ely/M & T Harris)
"Hiding" (M & T Harris)
"Birds" (M & T Harris)
"If You're Happy And You Know It" (Trad. arr. M & T Harris)
"Lola Loves To Dance" (M & T Harris)
"There Are Many Stars" (M & T Harris)
"Tom Tom" (M & T Harris)
"Let's Put On A Show" (K Johnson/M & T Harris)

Personnel
Tina Harris (Lah-Lah) - Vocals
Mark Harris (Buzz) - vocals/double bass
Jess Ciampa (Tom Tom) - drums/percussion/backing vocals
Marcello Maio (Squeezy Sneezy) - accordion/piano/keyboards
Matt Ottignon (Mr Saxophone) - tenor sax/soprano sax/clarinet/flute

Notes

External links
 Lah-Lah site

2009 albums
Children's music albums